Morris Miller is the name of:

Morris S. Miller (1779–1824), United States Representative from New York
E. Morris Miller (1881–1964), Australian author

See also
Maurice Miller, British politician